Prepiella deicoluria is a moth in the subfamily Arctiinae. It was described by Schaus in 1940. It is found in Guyana.

References

Natural History Museum Lepidoptera generic names catalog

Moths described in 1940
Lithosiini